These monarchs are listed in the Pictish chronicles, made during the reign of Kenneth II (971-995). These monarchs are usually known as legendary or mythical kings of the Picts, this list goes up to Vipoig, for rulers after this see List of kings of the Picts.

Cruithne and his seven sons 

"Cruidne the son of Cinge, father of the Picts living in this island, ruled for 100 years. He had 7 sons. These are their names: Fib, Fidach, Floclaid, Fortrenn, Got, Ce, Circinn."
 Cruithne ruled Pictland for 135 years.
 Fib ruled Fife for 24 years 
 Fidach ruled *1 for 40 years
 Floclaid ruled Athole for 30 years
 Fortren ruled Perth *2 for 70 years
 Cait ruled Caithness for 12 years
 Ce ruled *3 for 15 years
 Circin ruled Mearns for 40 years

Rulers of the Picts (before the Brudes)

The Brudes 
According to the Pictish Chronicles "Brude bont, from whom 30 Brudes ruled Ireland and Albany for the space of 150 years, himself ruled for 48 years. They were: pant, urpant, leo, uleo, gant, urgant, gnith, urgnith, fecir, urfecir, cal, urcal, cint, urcint, fet, urfet, ru, eru, gart et urgart, cinid, urcnid, uip, uruip, grid, urgrid, mund, urmund"

This means Bont ruled for 48 years, and for 102 years the lands were ruled by the other 28 brudes, there are not 30 brudes as mentioned, there are 28/29 brudes. After the brudes Gilgidi ruled for 150 years.

Rulers of the Picts (after the Brudes)

Before Vipoig 

Vipoig was the first confirmed king of the Picts ruling from 312-342 and was succeeded by Canutulachama. For further reading see List of kings of the Picts.

References 

Picts in fiction
Pictish monarchs